A birth name is the name of a person given upon birth. The term may be applied to the surname, the given name, or the entire name. Where births are required to be officially registered, the entire name entered onto a birth certificate or birth register may by that fact alone become the person's legal name.

The assumption in the Western world is often that the name from birth (or perhaps from baptism or brit milah) will persist to adulthood in the normal course of affairs—either throughout life or until marriage. Some possible changes concern middle names, diminutive forms, changes relating to parental status (due to one's parents' divorce or adoption by different parents). Matters are very different in some cultures in which a birth name is for childhood only, rather than for life.

Maiden and married names 

The French and English-adopted terms née and né denote an original surname at birth.

The term née, having feminine grammatical gender, can be used to denote a woman's surname at birth that has been replaced or changed. In most English-speaking cultures, it is specifically applied to a woman's maiden name after her surname has changed due to marriage.

The term né, having masculine grammatical gender, can be used to denote a man's surname at birth that has subsequently been replaced or changed. The diacritic marks (the acute accent) are considered significant to its spelling, and ultimately its meaning, but are sometimes omitted.

According to Oxford University's Dictionary of Modern English Usage, the terms are typically placed after the current surname (e.g., "Margaret Thatcher, née Roberts" or "Bill Clinton, né Blythe"). Since they are terms adopted into English (from French), they do not have to be italicized, but they often are.

In Polish tradition, the term  (literally meaning "of the house" in Latin) may be used, with rare exceptions, meaning the same as née.

Notes

References 

Birth
Human names